The Way of the Fist is the debut studio album by American heavy metal band Five Finger Death Punch, released on July 31, 2007. The album sold 3,800 copies in its first week of release. The Way of the Fist made its Billboard 200 debut on August 18, 2007, at No. 199 and peaked at No. 107. It has been certified Gold for selling in excess of 500,000 copies as of April 13, 2011. This is the band's only release with guitarist Darrell Roberts.

Recording and release
The band entered Next Level Studios and Complex Studios in Los Angeles, California, to record The Way of the Fist. The album was recorded with Stevo "Shotgun" Bruno (Mötley Crüe, Prong) and Mike Sarkisyan (Spineshank) and was mixed by former Machine Head and Soulfly guitarist Logan Mader. Shortly after, they signed a deal with Firm Music, a branch of "The Firm". It was released on July 31, 2007, selling 5,400 copies in its first week of release to debut at No. 199 on the Billboard 200 chart and peaked at No. 107. The album sold an additional 1,400 copies in digital downloads its first week of release.

Reissues

2008 reissue
On May 13, 2008, The Way of the Fist was re-released. The re-release contained three new bonus tracks, "Never Enough", "Stranger than Fiction", and an acoustic version of "The Bleeding". The three songs could also be obtained on the band's website by anyone who had purchased a copy of the original release of the album.

"Iron Fist" edition
On November 22, 2010, the album was reissued again as a deluxe box set entitled The Way of The Fist: Iron Fist Edition. This version features new artwork, a documentary DVD, The Legend of The Fist Vol. 1, music videos for "The Bleeding", "Never Enough" and "The Way of the Fist", a bonus CD with 11 B-sides and rarities, trading cards, and an exclusive poster and calendar. One of the tracks on disc two "From Out of Nowhere" was originally played live. They later recorded it and released it on the second disc.

15th Anniversary Re-Recorded Version
Five Finger Death Punch are planning on re-recording The Way of the Fist along with their ninth studio album being recorded. With their ninth studio album AfterLife having released on August 19, 2022, the re-recorded version of The Way of the Fist may debut in 2024.

Track listing

Singles
Three singles were released from the album, "The Bleeding", "Never Enough", and "Stranger than Fiction".

Charts

Certifications

Personnel

Five Finger Death Punch
 Ivan Moody – lead vocals
 Zoltan Bathory – guitars
 Darrell Roberts – guitars (original version)
 Jason Hook - guitars (credited on the Iron Fist Edition only)
 Matt Snell – bass, backing vocals (original version)
 Jeremy Spencer – drums (original version)
 Chris Kael - bass (re-recorded version)
 Charlie Engen - drums (re-recorded version)
 Andy James - guitars (re-recorded version)
Additional musicians
 Uros Raskovski – guitar solo on "The Bleeding"

Production
 Zoltan Bathory and Jeremy Spencer – production (original version)
 Logan Mader – mixing and mastering (original version)
 Stevo "Shotgun" Bruno – engineering (original version)
 Mike Sarkisyan – engineering (original version)
 George Alayon – engineering (original version)
 Sxv'Leithan Essex – artwork
 Kevin Churko - production, audio mixing, audio mastering, and engineering (re-recorded version)

References

2007 debut albums
Five Finger Death Punch albums
Spinefarm Records albums
Albums produced by Logan Mader